D.I.T.C. is an American hip hop collective.

DITC may also refer to:

 D.I.T.C. (album), a studio album by D.I.T.C.
 Dubuque Intermodal Transportation Center, an American transport hub